{{DISPLAYTITLE:CeCoIn5}}

CeCoIn5 ("Cerium-Cobalt-Indium 5") is a heavy-fermion superconductor with a layered crystal structure, with somewhat two-dimensional electronic transport properties. The critical temperature of 2.3 K is the highest among all of the Ce-based heavy-fermion superconductors.

Material system 
CeCoIn5 is a member of a rich family of heavy-fermion compounds. CeIn3 is heavy-fermion metal with cubic crystal structure that orders antiferromagnetically below 10K. With applying external pressure, antiferromagnetism in CeIn3 is continuously suppressed, and a superconducting dome emerges in the phase diagram near the antiferromagnetic quantum critical point. CeCoIn5 has a tetragonal crystal structure, and the unit cell of CeCoIn5 can be considered as 'CeIn3 with an additional CoIn2 layer per unit cell'.
Closely related to CeCoIn5 is the heavy-fermion material CeRhIn5, which has the same crystal structure and which orders antiferromagnetically below 4K, but does not become superconducting at ambient pressure. At high pressure CeRhIn5 becomes superconducting with a maximum Tc slightly above 2 K at a pressure around 2 GPa, and at the same pressure the Fermi surface of CeRhIn5 changes  suggesting so-called local quantum criticality. 
Also the compound PuCoGa5, which is a superconductor with Tc approximately 18.5 K and which can be considered an intermediate between heavy-fermion and cuprate superconductors, has the same crystal structure.

Growth of single-crystalline CeCoIn5 has been very successful soon after the discovery of the material, and large single crystals of CeCoIn5, such as required for inelastic neutron scattering, have been prepared. (In contrast to some other heavy-fermion compounds where single-crystal growth is more challenging.)

Superconducting properties 
The upper critical magnetic field Hc2 of the superconducting state of CeCoIn5 is anisotropic, in accordance with the crystal structure and other physical properties. For magnetic fields applied along the [100] direction, Hc2 amounts to approximately 11.6 T, and Hc2 for fields along the [001] directions to 4.95 T.

The superconducting order parameter has d-wave symmetry, as established by several experiments, such as scanning tunneling microscopy (STM) and spectroscopy (STS).

Detailed studies close to the critical field have been performed on CeCoIn5, and indications were found that certain regimes in the phase diagram of this material should be interpreted in terms of the Fulde–Ferrell–Larkin–Ovchinnikov (FFLO) phase.
Subsequently, the neutron-diffraction experiments showed that this regime features a more complex phase that also exhibits incommensurate antiferromagnetic order, a so-called 'Q phase'.

Evidence for a delocalization quantum phase transition without symmetry breaking is presented.

References 

Superconductors
Correlated electrons
Cerium compounds
Cobalt compounds
Indium compounds
Intermetallics